Ricardo Krebs Wilckens  (December 2, 1918 – December 23, 2011) was a Chilean historian of German descent. In 1943, Krebs joined the newly founded Pedagogy School (Escuela de Pedagogía) of the Pontifical Catholic University of Chile, where he was in charge of the universal history course. Krebs, as a native of Valparaíso, had until then spent a career in Germany and so he was rather isolated with few contacts in Santiago.

That changed when he met Jaime Eyzaguirre at the Pedagogy School, who introduced him to the Catholic intellectual elite of Santiago. He was part of the editorial committee of the journal Historia since it was established in 1961.

References

1918 births
2011 deaths
Chilean people of German descent
People from Valparaíso
Leipzig University alumni
Academic staff of the Pontifical Catholic University of Chile
20th-century Chilean historians
20th-century Chilean male writers
21st-century Chilean historians
21st-century Chilean male writers